The 2002–2007 Spider-Man film series, also called the Sam Raimi trilogy or the Tobey Maguire trilogy, is a superhero film series consisting of three Spider-Man films with the same director and main actor: Spider-Man (2002), Spider-Man 2 (2004) and Spider-Man 3 (2007). Based on the Marvel comic book series about the fictional character of the same name, all three films were directed by Sam Raimi and distributed by Columbia Pictures. Tobey Maguire plays the titular role, with Kirsten Dunst portraying his love interest, Mary Jane Watson, and James Franco concluding the principal cast with his role as Harry Osborn, Spider-Man's frenemy. Throughout the series, the Spider-Man releases featured villains such as Green Goblin (Willem Dafoe), Doctor Octopus (Alfred Molina), Sandman (Thomas Haden Church) and Venom (Topher Grace). Other characters who appeared in the series are Betty Brant (Elizabeth Banks), J. Jonah Jameson (J. K. Simmons) and Gwen Stacy (Bryce Dallas Howard).

Every Spider-Man film was a financial success and achieved blockbuster status. Each installment was the third top-grossing film of their respective release years. In 2002, The Lord of the Rings: The Two Towers and Harry Potter and the Chamber of Secrets performed better than Spider-Man. For 2004, Shrek 2 and Harry Potter and the Prisoner of Azkaban had grossed more than Spider-Man 2 and Pirates of the Caribbean: At World's End and Harry Potter and the Order of the Phoenix outdid Spider-Man 3s revenue. With a box office total of nearly $900 million, Spider-Man 3 stands as the highest-earning in the series and is the 31st highest-grossing film worldwide. The previous two entries sit at 41st and 48th in worldwide totals. The franchise made around $2.5 billion at the box office in ticket sales.

Overall, the film series received positive to polarized reception from critics. Spider-Man was released to largely positive reviews from the media, scoring an 89% rating based on a sample of 192 reviews on review aggregator Rotten Tomatoes with an average of 7.6/10. The second entry performed even better with critics, garnering an approval rating of 93% on Rotten Tomatoes, with an average rating of 8.2 out of 10. With 241 reviews accounted for, Rotten Tomatoes reported that Spider-Man 3 had an approval rating of 63% and a score of 6.2/10. Metacritic lists the third installment as having a 59% rating on its site. Spider-Man 2 was named the third best superhero film of all-time by IGN and Time magazine.

Raimi's Spider-Man series won various awards and gathered five Academy Award nominations: two for Spider-Man and three for Spider-Man 2, with one win for Best Visual Effects in 2005 for Spider-Man 2. The series won two MTV Movie Awards out of ten nominations, five Saturn Awards out of thirteen nominations and four Teen Choice Awards out of fifteen nominations. The films were nominated for one Annie Award, five British Academy Film Awards, two Grammy Awards and ten Satellite Awards. Other honors came from the Visual Effects Society Awards, which gave the franchise ten nominations and three wins, as well as the Taurus World Stunt Awards, which nominated the films for three of their accolades. The American Film Institute named Spider-Man 2 one of the Best Movie Productions of 2004.

Spider-Man (2002)

The first film in the franchise, Spider-Man, was released to US theaters on May 3, 2002. Its story follows Peter Parker (played by Tobey Maguire), a high-school student who turns to crime-fighting in New York, under the alias of Spider-Man, after developing spider-like powers. The film sees him develop friendships with Harry Osborn (James Franco) and his love interest, Mary Jane Watson (portrayed by Kirsten Dunst). Spider-Man was praised for staying faithful to the comic series and for being an enjoyable movie, with Joe Morgenstern of The Wall Street Journal finding the film to be "unusually good" for its genre. Raimi's 2002 release topped the box office with ticket revenue totaling to $114.8 million. By the end of its theatrical run, it had grossed over $820 million.

Its visual effects and sound were nominated by several award committees, including the Academy Awards, for being the best in film for that year. Danny Elfman work on the film's music earned him an accolade from BMI Film and TV Awards. The film's song "Hero", performed by Chad Kroeger, scored nominations from the Broadcast Film Critics Association and 45th Grammy Awards. Dunst's performance as an aspiring actress who works as a waitress earned her both an Empire Award and an accolade from the viewer-voted 2003 MTV Movie Awards. She also shared an award from the latter for Best Kiss with Maguire, who was nominated for Best Male Performance from the same ceremony. The Golden Trailer Awards nominated the film's trailers for four awards and Spider-Mans stunt work earned it one nomination from the World Stunt Awards.

Spider-Man 2 (2004) 

Spider-Man 2 opened in US theaters on June 30, 2004. This entry focuses on Peter Parker's struggles, as he tries to manage both his personal life and his duties as Spider-Man. He also has to stop the film's main villain, Doctor Octopus (Alfred Molina), a man who becomes insane after an experiment of his goes haywire. Spider-Man 2  was less successful in its first week of release, taking first place at the box office with around $88 million at 4,152 locations. Nonetheless, the sequel set several box office records at the time and broke the record for best opening day title ever, previously held by the preceding Spider-Man film. It eventually made more than $783 million worldwide but still stands as the lowest-grossing in the trilogy. However, it also stands as the best received film in the franchise. Movie critics believed the second installment had better humor and action sequences than its predecessor and that it was "unusually good" for its genre. A writer for website IGN said this film had "a better flowing storyline, more emotional depth, and a less ridiculous looking supervillain, Spider-Man 2 elevated the series to just about everything that comic fans love about the character." The website also ranked Spider-Man 2 as being the third best superhero film of all-time on their 2005 list. Time magazine also named the sequel the third best superhero movie on their top-ten list published in 2011.

Out of the film's three Academy Award nominations, Spider-Man 2 was awarded Best Visual Effects. At the 58th British Academy Film Awards, the sequel's sound and visual effects were nominated. A third nomination was for Orange Film of the Year, a category for the 10 biggest United Kingdom box office hits, voted by the public. The film itself also won the Broadcast Film Critics Association Awards's Best Popular Movie honor and was named one of 2004's best pictures by the American Film Institute committee. Spider-Man 2 swept the 31st Saturn Awards with eight nominations and four wins. Maguire and Raimi respectively picked up the Best Actor and Best Director awards and the film was named 2004's Best Fantasy Film. Its writing, supporting performance by Molina and music were among other aspects the Saturn Awards nominated Spider-Man 2 for. At the 2005 MTV Movie Awards, Molina got another nomination, this time for Best Villain. The award show also nominated the sequel for its Best Movie Honor. Another awards organization to honor Molina's portrayal of Doctor Octopus were the London Film Critics Circle Awards, who nominated him for the year's Best Supporting Actor. The 10th Empire Awards gave Raimi his second accolade for his direction on Spider-Man 2. Its overall featured stunt work won it a World Stunt Award and its visual effects scored Spider-Man 2 six Visual Effects Society Award nominations.

Spider-Man 3 (2007)

Columbia Pictures gave Spider-Man 3 a US release on May 4, 2007. The film begins with Peter Parker basking in his success as Spider-Man before an extraterrestrial symbiote takes control of him. Peter must then battle a rival photographer that the symbiote then takes control of (Topher Grace) and the Sandman (Thomas Haden Church). The general consensus among critics was that the final installment was not as refined as the first two entries, with it being criticized for its excessive use of villains, romantic conflicts and weak plot points. Nonetheless, Spider-Man 3 surpassed the previous two films' openings, making $151 million at over 4,250 locations.

Both the 35th Annie Awards and 61st British Academy Film Awards gave this film one nomination, the former for Best Animated Effects and the latter for Best Special Visual Effects. Spider-Man 3 did not win any of the four Visual Effects Society Awards nominations it received. Dunst's and Maguire's performances earned them each one nomination from the National Movie Awards. She also received another nomination for Favorite Movie Actress from the 2008 Kids' Choice Awards ceremony. The film fared better at the Teen Choice Awards, amounting a total of seven nominations, varying from Choice Movie Villain (for Grace) to Choice Movie Dance (for Maguire) and Choice Movie Liplock (shared between Dunst and Maguire).

References 
 General

 
 
 

 Specific

External links 
 
 
 

Spider-Man
Spider-Man lists
Spider-Man (2002 film series)